Giovanni Paolo Castelli (1659–1730) was an Italian painter, active in Rome painting still-life paintings of bowls of fruit and flowers. Over half a dozen works are collected in the Pinacoteca Civica Fortunato Duranti.

External links
 Bowl of fruit at MFA in Boston.
 White rabbit, apples, grapes, and melons in a landscape.
Fruit in glass bowl at Pinacoteca in Rieti

17th-century Italian painters
Italian male painters
18th-century Italian painters
Italian still life painters
Italian Baroque painters
1659 births
1730 deaths
18th-century Italian male artists